Parangitia is a genus of moths of the family Noctuidae. The genus was erected by Herbert Druce in 1909.

Species
Parangitia atys Schaus, 1914 French Guiana
Parangitia cana (H. Druce, 1909) Peru
Parangitia carrioni (Dogin, 1890) Ecuador
Parangitia centrochalca Dyar, 1914 Mexico
Parangitia cervina Hampson, 1910 Guyana
Parangitia chlorosticta Schaus, 1914 French Guiana
Parangitia circumcincta Dyar, 1914 Panama
Parangitia corma Schaus, 1921 Guatemala
Parangitia diaperas Dognin, 1914 French Guiana
Parangitia grisescens Hampson, 1910 Panama
Parangitia guanacaste Schaus, 1911 Costa Rica
Parangitia micapennis Kaye, 1922 Trinidad
Parangitia micrina Berio, 1966 Tanzania, Zaire, Madagascar
Parangitia mosaica Dyar, 1914 Mexico
Parangitia mulator Schaus, 1921 Guatemala
Parangitia nephelistis Hampson, 1910 Brazil (Amazonas, Pará)
Parangitia nigrofulgens Kaye, 1922 Trinidad
Parangitia rufa (H. Druce, 1909) Peru
Parangitia subrufescens (Kaye, 1901) Trinidad
Parangitia temperata Schaus, 1911 Costa Rica
Parangitia veluta H. Druce, 1909 Peru
Parangitia virescens (H. Druce, 1909) Peru

References

Acontiinae